Jon Kinyon (born March 29, 1962) is an American writer, Emmy Award-nominated TV editor, filmmaker, music producer, and entrepreneur.

Hot Rod Condoms
Jon Kinyon is the founder and president of Hot Rod Condoms, a U.S. condom brand which he launched in 1994.

God Squad!
In 2002 he wrote, produced and directed God Squad!, a comedy film which parodied Christian Films and 1970s Buddy Cop Films. It featured cult film actress and former Penthouse Pet of the Year (1993) Julie Strain as well as actor Al Israel who is famous for his roles in Scarface, Carlito's Way, and Body Double. Composer Bob Crail is credited with writing the film's musical score. After its premiere at the Academy Award accredited Los Angeles International Short Film Festival the film went on to screen at Tromadance 2003, the Backseat Film Festival and several other U.S. film festivals. This film is included in the European version of "The Best of Tromadance" DVD.

The Jimi Homeless Experience

Webcomic
A fictional character named Jimi Homeless first appeared in a series of webcomics published as The Jimi Homeless Experience in 2006. The webcomics were written by Jon Kinyon and drawn by an underground cartoonist known as Big Tasty. The strip was primarily about a small group of social outcasts and proudly flaunted its Grotesque orientation and black humor.

Parody album
August 23, 2007, Jon released a full-length CD of parody songs he had written and produced, all inspired by the aforementioned webcomic. The first CD by The Jimi Homeless Experience was released on the exact day of the 40th anniversary of Jimi Hendrix' first album release Are You Experienced, his Are You Homeless? features "Weird Al" Yankovic-styled parodies of some of Hendrix' biggest hits.

Stop motion animation
On March 6, 2008 he became the first "featured animator" on the now defunct MyToons, a YouTube-styled website specifically geared for 2-D and 3-D animation, with a stop motion animation parody of Jimi Hendrix' key performance at the 1967 Monterey Pop Festival.

Night of the Loving Dead (2014)
Jon Kinyon wrote and directed a parody of the classic horror film Night of the Living Dead. The short film was co-produced with his two brothers C.J. Kinyon and C.C. Kinyon, and was filmed at a long-abandoned cemetery in Half Moon Bay, CA. It premiered as an Official Selection in the web based film festival Once a Week Online Film Festival.

Television editor at Nickelodeon
Jon has worked in the film and television industry since 1988. He has been a film and TV editor in Los Angeles, California, since 1997 and has been employed at Nickelodeon Animation Studio since 2005. He served as supervising picture editor for 3 seasons of the animated TV show Pinky Malinky. Season 1 of the show was released by Netflix on January 1, 2019.

Daytime Emmy Award nomination
The 2020 Daytime Emmy nominations were announced on Thursday, May 21, live on CBS’ The Talk and later on Gold Derby. Nominated for “Outstanding Editing for an Animated Program” was the show Pinky Malinky on which Jon worked as the lead editor.

Short stories published by OZY Magazine
A total of seven stories were published by OZY between August 2017 and August 2020.

 "Stepdaddy Dearest: Putting The Crime Into Crime Family" is a story Jon wrote about his criminal stepfather. It was published on August 29, 2017.

 "Will The Real Parachuting Hijacker Please Stand Up" is a story about a family friend who spent 30 years as a suspect in the D.B. Cooper hijacking case. It was published on April 19, 2018. 

 "Who Murdered My Father?" is a story is about the murder of Jon's father in 1972, as well as the subsequent lies, obfuscation, and runaround the San Francisco Police Department forced his family to endure. It was published on November 26, 2018.

 “Raising Hell, Raised by Hells Angels” was published on September 26, 2019. This story is about a long time family friend who became President of the Daly City chapter of the Hells Angels.

 “That Time I Was Roofied In Hong Kong” is a story about a dangerous vacation experience in Wan Chai, Hong Kong. It was published on November 12, 2019.

 "The Convivial Call of Casual Racism" was published on July 22, 2020 and it details a run in with a race-baiter at a Fourth of July party in the Hollywood Hills.

 "When Jesus Freaks Go Bad" was published on August 6, 2020. An accidental death leads to Jon's friend becoming a religious zealot. As time passes, his friend's religious beliefs turn more political and radical.

Private investigation: Andy Kinyon Cold Case

On Sept. 10, 2021, a story about Jon Kinyon's private investigation into his father's 1972 murder cold case made the front cover of his hometown weekly newspaper: Palo Alto Weekly. Suspicions of a 40-year police cover-up and continued stonewalling by the San Francisco Police Department are laid out in the article. 

In May 2022, the story, "Searching For Their Father's Killer," won First Place for Investigative Reporting in the 2021 California Journalism Awards for print weeklies with a circulation of 25,000 and over, presented by the California News Publishers Association.

References

External links
 Jon Kinyon official website
 

American film directors
American film editors
American television editors
American webcomic creators
American parodists
American short story writers
American satirists
Living people
American screenwriters
The Jimi Homeless Experience members
Year of birth missing (living people)